Seetha Rama Vanavasam is a 1977 Bollywood drama film directed by Kamalakara Kameshwara Rao.

Cast 
Ravi... Ram
Jayapradha... Sita
Satyanarayan... Ravan
Gummadi... Dasharath
Saroja Devi... Mandodari
Anjali... Kaushalya
Vijaylalita... Kaikeyi
 Jamuna... Shabari

Music 
Hindi version
"Aao Aao Raavan Maharaj" – Vani Jairam
"Awadhpuri Singhasan Saje" – Mahendra Kapoor
"Darshan To Dene Ko Aa Re Raam Tu" – Vani Jairam
"Gao Me Yash Gaan Tera" – Vani Jairam
"Giri Giri Saj Dhaj Mai Aayi Hu" – Vani Jairam
"Jai Ho Jai Jai Seeta Raam" – S. P. Balasubrahmanyam, B. Vasantha
"Mat Ja Re Raama" – Mahendra Kapoor
"Shri Raam Ka Naam Ki Lo Sharan" – Vani Jairam
"Siya To Chahe Aage Chalna" – Vani Jairam

External links 
 

1977 films
1970s Telugu-language films
1977 drama films
Films based on the Ramayana
Films directed by Kamalakara Kameswara Rao
Films scored by K. V. Mahadevan